The 1990 Kingston upon Thames Council election took place on 3 May 1990 to elect members of Kingston upon Thames London Borough Council in London, England. The whole council was up for election and the council stayed in no overall control.

Election result

Ward results

References

1990
1990 London Borough council elections